Towradgi railway station is located on the South Coast railway line in New South Wales, Australia. It serves the northern Wollongong suburb of Towradgi opening on 18 December 1948.

Platforms & services
Towradgi Station has two side platforms serviced by NSW TrainLink South Coast line services travelling from Waterfall and Thirroul to Port Kembla. Some peak hour and late night services operate to Sydney Central, Bondi Junction and Kiama.

References

External links

Towradgi station details Transport for New South Wales

Buildings and structures in Wollongong
Railway stations in Australia opened in 1948
Regional railway stations in New South Wales